This is a list of Swedish television related events from 2013.

Events
18 May - The 58th Eurovision Song Contest is held at the Malmö Arena in Malmö. Denmark wins the contest with the song "Only Teardrops", performed by Emmelie de Forest.
31 May - Rapper Markoolio and his partner Cecilia Ehrling win the eighth season of Let's Dance.
6 December - Kevin Walker wins the ninth season of Idol.

Debuts
19 August - Idol (2004-2011, 2013–present)

Television shows

2000s
Let's Dance (2006–present)

2010s
1–24 December - Barna Hedenhös uppfinner julen

Ending this year

Births

Deaths

See also
2013 in Sweden

References